Sweet Little Rock 'n' Roller may refer to:
Sweet Little Rock 'n' Roller, an album and title track by Jerry Williams
"Sweet Little Rock 'n' Roller", a song by Chuck Berry
"Sweet Little Rock 'n' Roller", a song by Chris von Rohr from the album Hammer & Tongue